Gordon & MacPhail is an independent bottler and distiller of Scotch Whisky, founded in 1895 and located in Elgin in the north-east of Scotland. It is a family business owned by the Urquhart Family. Gordon & MacPhail is the Trading name of Speymalt Whisky Distributors Ltd.

Independent Bottler 
Gordon & MacPhail has been bottling single malt whiskies for over 115 years, and now bottles over 350 different expressions from around 70 distilleries.

The World's Oldest Whisky 
On 11 March 2010, Gordon & MacPhail made history by launching Mortlach 70 Years Old Speyside Single Malt Scotch Whisky, the world's oldest bottled single malt whisky.

On 8 March 2011, Gordon & MacPhail released the 2nd in the Generations series by launching Glenlivet 1940 70 Years Old.

On 20 September 2012 Gordon & MacPhail released Generations Glenlivet 1940 70 Years Old (Release 2). This second, and final, release from Cask 339 created worldwide interest, with a number of these bottles distributed as far as Australia through Alba Whisky.

In 2021, the company released a new whisky which extended the record: Generations 80-Year-Old from Glenlivet.

The Shop 
Gordon & MacPhail's retail shop is located on South Street in Elgin. The shop is split into four sections. The Deli, The Wines and Spirits Department, The Grocery Department, and The Whisky Room, which has one of the largest collections of whisky in the world.

Distiller 
In 1993 Gordon & MacPhail purchased Benromach Distillery in Forres.

References

External links 
 Gordon & MacPhail Official Page
 Gordon & MacPhail Generations

Bottling companies
Drink companies of Scotland